In Concert at the Troubadour, 1969 is a live country rock album by Ricky Nelson recorded in Los Angeles during four dates at The Troubadour in late 1969. The album featured the debut of the Stone Canyon Band, which included Randy Meisner, Tom Brumley, Allen Kemp, and Patrick Shanahan, and was Nelson's highest-charting release in three years. The album contains four songs written by Nelson and three Bob Dylan compositions, as well as other songs by Eric Andersen and Tim Hardin. The performances were attended by many fellow musicians and songwriters.

In 2011, the British label Ace Records issued a remastered version of In Concert at the Troubadour on two compact discs with 30 bonus tracks and a booklet containing detailed information about the shows and songs that were recorded.

Track listing
"Come on In" (Rick Nelson)
"Hello Mary Lou" (Gene Pitney)
"Violets of Dawn" (Eric Andersen)
"Who Cares About Tomorrow/Promises" (Nelson)
"She Belongs to Me" (Bob Dylan)
"If You Gotta Go, Go Now" (Dylan)
"I'm Walkin'" (Fats Domino, Dave Bartholomew)
"Red Balloon" (Tim Hardin)
"Louisiana Man" (Doug Kershaw)
"Believe What You Say" (Dorsey Burnette, Johnny Burnette)
"Easy to Be Free" (Nelson)
"I Shall Be Released" (Dylan)

2011 Ace Records reissue

Disc one
"Come on In" (Nelson) - 2:40
"Hello Mary Lou, Goodbye Heart" (Gene Pitney) – 2:35
"Violets of Dawn" (Eric Andersen) – 3:25
"Who Cares About Tomorrow/Promises" (Nelson) – 5:42
"She Belongs to Me" (Bob Dylan) – 2:54
"If You Gotta Go, Go Now" (Dylan) – 2:52
"I'm Walkin'" (Fats Domino, Dave Bartholomew) – 1:56
"Red Balloon" (Tim Hardin) – 3:20
"Louisiana Man" (Doug Kershaw) – 3:07
"Believe What You Say" (Dorsey Burnette, Johnny Burnette) – 2:03
"Easy to Be Free" (Nelson) – 3:22
"I Shall Be Released" (Dylan) – 4:06
"Violets of Dawn" (Andersen) – 3:12
"Travelin' Man" (Jerry Fuller) - 2:16
"Tonight I'll Be Staying Here with You" (Dylan) – 2:41
"I'm Walkin'" (Domino, Bartholomew) – 2:01
"Louisiana Man" (Doug Kershaw) – 2:59
"She Belongs to Me" (Dylan) – 2:46
"I Shall Be Released" (Dylan) – 3:48
"Lady Came From Baltimore" (Hardin) - 2:21
"Poor Little Fool" (Sharon Sheeley) - 2:18
"Hello Mary Lou, Goodbye Heart" (Pitney) – 2:34

Tracks 1-12 are from the original 1970 album; Tracks 13-22 are newly mixed alternate performances.

Disc two
"Intro/Come on In" (Nelson) - 2:39
"Hello Mary Lou" (Pitney) – 2:47
"I Shall Be Released" (Dylan) – 3:43
"Don Everly Intro/Bye Bye Love" (B. Bryant, F. Bryant) - 2:25
"I'm Walkin'" (Domino, Bartholomew) – 1:54
"Red Balloon" (Hardin) – 3:11
"My Bucket's Got a Hole in It" (Clarence Williams) - 2:16
"Easy to Be Free" (Nelson) – 3:13
"Louisiana Man" (Kershaw) – 2:55
"Tonight I'll Be Staying Here with You" (Dylan) – 2:48
"Travelin' Man" (Fuller) - 2:09
"She Belongs to Me" (Dylan) – 2:50
"Poor Little Fool" (Sheeley) - 2:20
"I Think It's Going To Rain Today" (Randy Newman) - 3:18
"Believe What You Say" (D. Burnette, J. Burnette) – 2:04
"Who Cares About Tomorrow/Promises" (Nelson) – 5:36
"Lady Came From Baltimore" (Hardin) - 2:16
"Violets of Dawn" (Eric Andersen) – 3:25
"It's Late" (Dorsey Burnette) - 2:10
"If You Gotta Go, Go Now" (Dylan) – 3:18

All tracks on disc two are newly mixed alternate performances from the 1969 Troubadour shows.

Personnel
Rick Nelson - rhythm guitar, vocals
Randy Meisner - bass guitar, vocals
Allen Kemp - lead guitar, vocals
Tom Brumley - steel guitar
Patrick Shanahan - drums

Production
Producer: Rick Nelson, Randy Meisner [Joe Sutton, Rick's manager at the time, was also credited]
Production coordination: John Walsh
Art Direction: Unknown
Photography: Bill Levy
Liner notes: Eric Andersen

References

Ricky Nelson albums
1969 live albums
Decca Records live albums
Albums produced by Joe Sutton
Albums produced by Ricky Nelson
Albums recorded at the Troubadour